Vexillum zebuense is a species of small sea snail, marine gastropod mollusk in the family Costellariidae, the ribbed miters.

Description

Distribution
This marine species occurs off the Philippines..

References

External links
 Reeve, L. A. (1844-1845). Monograph of the genus Mitra. In: Conchologia Iconica, or, illustrations of the shells of molluscous animals, vol. 2, pl. 1-39 and unpaginated text. L. Reeve & Co., London
 Gould, A. A. (1850). [descriptions of new species of shells from the United States Exploring Expedition. Proceedings of the Boston Society of Natural History. 3: 151-156, 169–172, 214-218, 252–256, 275–278, 292–296, 309–312, 343–348]
 Souverbie [S.M.. (1860). Descriptions d'espèces nouvelles de l'Archipel Calédonien (5è article). Journal de Conchyliologie. 8(3): 311-326, pl. 11]
 Sowerby, G. B. III. (1879). Descriptions of ten new species of shells. Proceedings of the Zoological Society of London. 1878: 795–798, pl. 48. 
 Cernohorsky, W. O. & Jennings, A. (1965). The Mitridae of Fiji. Veliger. 8(2): 70-160, pls 13-23.
  Cernohorsky, Walter Oliver. The Mitridae of Fiji; The veliger vol. 8 (1965)

zebuense
Gastropods described in 1844